Valentin Tabellion (born 23 March 1999) is a French professional racing cyclist, who currently rides for UCI Continental team . He rode in the men's team pursuit event at the 2020 UCI Track Cycling World Championships in Berlin, Germany.

Major results

2016
 National Junior Track Championships
1st  Individual pursuit
1st  Scratch
1st  Kilometer
2nd Team pursuit
2017
 3rd  Omnium, UEC European Junior Track Championships
 3rd Individual pursuit, National Junior Track Championships
2018
 National Track Championships
2nd Points race
2nd Team pursuit
2019
 2019–20 UCI World Cup
1st  Team pursuit – Milton
2nd  Team pursuit – Minsk
3rd  Team pursuit – Glasgow
 National Track Championships
1st  Team pursuit
3rd Madison
2021
 National Track Championships
1st  Madison (with Thomas Denis)
1st  Team pursuit
2nd Individual pursuit
 2nd  Team pursuit, UCI Track World Championships
2022
 10th Overall Ronde de l'Oise

References

External links
 

1999 births
Living people
French male cyclists
French track cyclists
Sportspeople from Boulogne-Billancourt
Cyclists from Île-de-France